Smokin is the debut album by American blues guitarist Jonny Lang, independently released in 1995 under the name Kid Jonny Lang & The Big Bang. (see 1995 in music).

Track listing
 "Louise" (Lang, Langseth) – 4:23
 "Changes" (Larsen) – 3:17
 "Lovin' My Baby" (Lang) – 3:10
 "I Love You the Best" (Lang) – 4:03
 "Nice & Warm" (Benoit) – 7:43
 "It's Obdacious" (Johnson) – 3:18
 "Sugarman " (Hayes) – 4:12
 ""E" Train" (Larsen, Larsen, Larsen) – 4:11
 "Too Tired" (Collins) – 3:15
 "Smokin'" (Lang, Larsen, Larsen) – 3:45
 "Malted Milk" (Johnson) – 3:17

Personnel
 "Kid" Jonny Lang - vocals, guitar
 Ted "Lightnin' Boy" Larsen - guitars, backing vocals
 Michael Rey Larsen - drums, backing vocals
 Jeff Hayes - bass guitar, backing vocals

References

Jonny Lang albums
1995 albums